Pinkstinks is a campaign founded in London in May 2008 by twin sisters Emma Moore and Abi Moore (born 1971, London) to raise awareness of what they claim is damage caused by gender stereotyping of children. Pinkstinks claims that the marketing of gender-specific products to young children encourages girls to limit their ambitions later in life.

Activities
Pinkstinks has created a listing of "Pinkstinks Approved" companies providing non-gender-specific play and learning products for children. In 2009 the campaign was reported as urging parents to boycott shops selling pink toys and gifts. In 2010 Pinkstinks criticised Marks and Spencer for labelling underwear aimed at six-year-old girls as "bra tops". John Lewis, Marks and Spencer and Sainsbury's have responded quickly to criticism by Pinkstinks, removing a "girls" label from a pink Playmobil set and a "boys" label from a science kit and adding non-gender-specific labels to children's nurse and doctor outfits.

Awards and recognition
The campaign's founders, Abi and Emma Moore, won an award in the Women Creating Change category at the 2009 Sheila McKechnie Foundation awards. In 2012 Pinkstinks won the Mumsnet Award for Promoting Body Confidence in Children.

In 2009 Bridget Prentice MP, who was then British Government Justice Minister, backed Pinkstinks' campaign to boycott shops selling Christmas gifts which were aimed particularly at either girls or boys, saying "It's about not funnelling girls into pretty, pretty jobs, but giving them aspirations and challenging them to fulfil their potential". Speaking in the UK Parliament, Lady Morgan, the junior children's minister, said that "it is extremely important that we ensure girls have a chance to play with trucks and trains and wear blue if they look pretty in blue and we shouldn't be defining how young people are looked after by the colour of their toys".

The campaign has also been backed by Ed Mayo, author and former UK government adviser on consumer issues, who said: "I feel this colour apartheid is one of the things that sets children on two separate railway tracks. One leads to higher pay, and higher status and one doesn't." According to Mayo, before World War II pink was more usually associated with boys, while blue – traditionally the colour of the Virgin Mary – was linked with girls. He said: "When you walk into a toy store, as the campaign Pinkstinks has argued, it is as if feminism had never happened."

International impact
Pinkstinks has attracted attention in other countries and has inspired the setting up of a similar campaign in Germany, set up in 2012 and based in Hamburg-Eimsbüttel.

See also
Feminism in the United Kingdom
Gendered associations of pink and blue
Gender neutrality
Gender polarization
Gender stereotypes

Let Books Be Books
Let Girls Be Girls
Let Toys Be Toys

References

Further reading

External links
Official UK website 
Pinkstinks video: "There's more than one way to be a girl", 2011
Pinkstinks video: "SLAP – On the face of Childhood", 2012
Pinkstinks Germany
Girls Out Loud: creating shining stars
Let Toys Be Toys
Pigtail Pals
Princess Free Zone

2008 establishments in England
Advocacy groups in Germany
Advocacy groups in the United Kingdom
Gender roles
Girls' toys and games
Non-profit organisations based in Hamburg
Non-profit organisations based in London
Organizations established in 2012
Parents' organizations
Toy controversies
Toy culture